Xi'an District, formerly Xi'an County, is a district of the city of Liaoyuan, Jilin Province, China.

Administrative divisions

Subdistricts:
Xiancheng Subdistrict, Dongshan Subdistrict, Fuguo Subdistrict, Xianfeng Subdistrict, Anjia Subdistrict, Tai'an Subdistrict

The only township is Dengta Township.

References

External links

County-level divisions of Jilin